Anticipation is a mixtape American singer Trey Songz, released on June 30, 2009.

On April 24, 2020, Trey Songz re-released the mixtape on streaming platforms, with the sequel mixtape Anticipation II.

Background
The songs of the mixtape came from unused tracks from his third album Ready (2009). He stated that: "The creation of Anticipation is for my fans, I want to give them something to listen to before Ready comes out. My fans are eagerly anticipating Ready so I am giving them something to help get ready for the direction of the new album. I just started recording on my days off and the music felt great. This is music without creative boundaries."

Track listing

References

2009 albums
Trey Songz albums